San Silvestro is a Romanesque-style deconsecrated Roman Catholic church in the historic center of the town of Orte in the province of Viterbo, region of Lazio, Italy.

History
The church was founded in the 12th century, putatively with a facade defined in 1195 by Binellius. Separate from the nave, in a small garden is the square campanile, with mullioned windows. The interior of the church had been embellished over the centuries, but a 19th-century reconstruction led to the more spare interior seen today. 

In 1967, the church was converted into the Museo Diocesano e d'Arte Sacra (Diocese Museum of Sacred Art). Along with other panels and altarpieces from religious institutions, it displays an 8th-century Byzantine mosaic of the Madonna derived from the Oratory of Pope John VII in Rome.

A column rescued from the refurbishment of the cathedral was erected in the piazza in front of the church.

Notes

Churches in the province of Viterbo
Romanesque architecture in Lazio
13th-century Roman Catholic church buildings in Italy